Benjamin Martin (born April 18, 1987, in Vancouver, British Columbia) is a male field hockey player, who played for the Canada national field hockey team at the 2015 Pan American Games and won a silver medal.

In 2016, he was named to Canada's Olympic team.

References

Living people
1987 births
Canadian male field hockey players
Pan American Games silver medalists for Canada
Field hockey players from Vancouver
Field hockey players at the 2016 Summer Olympics
Olympic field hockey players of Canada
Field hockey players at the 2015 Pan American Games
Pan American Games medalists in field hockey
Medalists at the 2015 Pan American Games